Landon Douglas Cassill (born July 7, 1989) is an American professional stock car racing driver. He last competed full-time in the NASCAR Xfinity Series, driving the No. 10 Chevrolet Camaro for Kaulig Racing.

Early career
Cassill was born in Cedar Rapids, Iowa, and began racing on a quad when he was 3 years old. Cassill moved to go-karts. He finished second in the Pro Kart Tour at Atlanta Motor Speedway at age 10. The following year, he earned his first of two Kart Series national championships. Cassill won four International Kart Federation (IKF) championships, some on dirt and some on asphalt.

In 2000, Cassill competed in three different classes: two karting and a midget class. He won all three state championships on the same night. Cassill won four more state championships at the Newton Kart Klub in Newton, Iowa in 2001. He then started racing in a modified at the half-mile Hawkeye Downs.

He was racing in the ASA Late Model Series (ASALMS) in 2003 while he was in high school at Jefferson High School in Cedar Rapids. He has also raced in legend, modified, and late model racecars. Other series include the American Speed Association and the CRA Super Series.

At age 16, he became the youngest winner in ASALMS history when he won at Lake Erie Speedway on June 9, 2006; holding the record until Erik Jones surpassed him at age 14 in 2010. On July 3, Cassill won his second ASALMS race, this time in a Southern Division race at South Georgia Motorsports Park near Cecil, Georgia. The win made him the first driver to win in both the Northern and Southern Divisions. He won his first Challenge Division race at I-70 Speedway on July 8, 2010, to become the first driver to win in all three divisions. For 196 laps, Landon held the runner-up position on the track to Peter Casilino.  Landon secured victory by edging Casilino off the track. Answering questions afterward about the win, Landon replied, "Hey rubbin's just racin what can I say!"

He finished second in the Challenge Division points behind Kelly Bires, and eleventh in the Northern Division despite starting in half of the races.

NASCAR

In 2006, Cassill was introduced to NASCAR through the GM Racing Development competition. He was one of 16 drivers that participated in the three-stage evaluation process that took place at Caraway Speedway in Asheboro, North Carolina, North Georgia Speedway in Chatsworth, Georgia, and Nashville Superspeedway.

Cassill was signed by Hendrick Motorsports in December 2006. In 2007, Cassill tested the team's Car of Tomorrow car at Lakeland Speedway and Greenville-Pickens Speedway. Along with his driving duties, Cassill has worked in the team's research and development program and drove during practices for the Hendrick pit crews. Cassill made his Nationwide Series debut at Gateway International Speedway in July 2007 after turning 18, as NASCAR requires national series drivers to be at least 18 years of age (regional series drivers can be 16). Cassill finished 32nd in his debut. He was in contention to score his first top-10 finish at Memphis before another driver spun him out on the final lap. In his six starts that year, his best finish was 18th at Dover.

In 2008, Cassill drove the No. 5 National Guard Chevrolet in 16 Nationwide series races for JR Motorsports and the No. 4 Phoenix Racing Chevrolet in the 3 road course races. In Cassill's first start of the season, at Nashville, he started 22nd and finished 19th, two laps down. He earned his first top-10 finish in the June race at Nashville with a 9th-place finish. He won his first pole at Loudon, but had to start at the back of the field due to an engine change. He quickly moved his way up in the race but was wrecked by Bobby Hamilton Jr., resulting in a 34th-place finish. He was involved in another incident with Hamilton Jr. at Memphis which resulted in an altercation following the race. In 19 starts, Cassill earned 5 top-10 finishes and won Rookie of the Year honors. He also drove a limited schedule in the Truck Series for Randy Moss Motorsports; garnering 3 top-10 finishes. Cassill made his lone 2009 start on October 24 at Memphis; driving Phoenix Racing's No. 1 Miccosukee Chevrolet to a 10th-place finish.

In 2010, he drove the No. 98 truck for Thorsport Racing in the NextEra Energy Resources 250 at Daytona, but was caught in an accident on the first lap of the race. He made 6 starts in the Nationwide Series: 3 in the No. 7 Chevrolet for JR Motorsports and 3 in the No. 09 Ford for RAB Racing. Cassill made his Cup Series debut at Michigan; driving for veteran team owner James Finch. He finished 38th in his Cup debut. He ran 15 other races that year for Finch, TRG Motorsports, and Larry Gunselman.

Cassill started the 2011 season with a 3rd-place finish in the opening Nationwide series race: the DRIVE4COPD 300 at Daytona. It would be his lone Nationwide start of the year. He drove in 3 Sprint Cup races for Germain Racing before moving over to Phoenix Racing. Cassill competed in 32 of the 36 races that year, with his best effort in the Heluva Good! Sour Cream Dips 400 at Michigan, where he started and finished 12th. After the end of the season, he was replaced for 2012 in the Phoenix Racing No. 51 by Kurt Busch.

In early February 2012, it was announced that Cassill would drive for Front Row Motorsports in the 2012 Daytona 500, driving the No. 26 Ford, but the deal fell through as Cassill received a full-season offer. Shortly after it was announced that Cassill would drive the No. 83 in 2012, driving for a new team, BK Racing, that purchased the assets and owners' points of the former Red Bull Racing Team. Cassill would go on to finish 31st in season points.

2013–2017

On January 17, 2013, it was announced that Cassill would leave BK Racing due to contract disagreements. In late February, he joined Circle Sport, driving the team's No. 33 in the Sprint Cup Series for the remainder of the season. In early March it was revealed that Cassill was suing BK Racing for a claim of unpaid winnings. Later in the season, starting at the Brickyard 400, Cassill began running in the No. 40, jointly fielded by Circle Sport and Hillman Racing, in a majority of races.

In December 2013, it was announced that Cassill would return to the No. 4 Chevrolet in the 2014 NASCAR Nationwide Series for JD Motorsports, replacing Mike Wallace as the team's lead driver, in addition to returning to the No. 40 Chevrolet for Circle Sport in the Sprint Cup Series.

In the 2014 Cup season, Cassill tied his career-best finish of 12th at the Daytona 500, and recorded his best career finish of 4th at the Geico 500. Carsforsale.com was the primary sponsor of Landon Cassill during these and four other races including Kansas Speedway, Sonoma Raceway, Indianapolis Motor Speedway, and Michigan International Speedway.

On December 16, 2014, G&K Services re-upped as a full-time associate sponsor with multiple primary sponsorships in select markets. Those races include Las Vegas Motor Speedway, Phoenix International Raceway, Texas Motor Speedway, Talladega Superspeedway, Bristol Motor Speedway, and Chicagoland Speedway.

On February 2, 2015, Snap Fitness returned to the No. 40 team for a second year, sponsoring the races at Atlanta, the All-Star Showdown, Charlotte Motor Speedway, Michigan International Speedway, and Darlington Raceway. On February 11, it was announced that Cassill would partner with Carsforsale.com for a second year. Carsforsale.com sponsored the Daytona 500 and five other Sprint Cup races in the 2015 season. He ran very strongly in the 2015 Coke Zero 400, but his underfunded car was involved in a massive crash on the last lap at the checkered flag; he would finish 13th.

With Hillman joining Premium Motorsports, Cassill lost his No. 40 ride. In 2016, Cassill joined Front Row Motorsports, driving the No. 38 Ford Fusion. During the Texas race, a big one occurred on lap 271, Cassill barely made it through. Cassill had his best performance of the season in the Food City 500, where he led 20 laps on a contrary fuel strategy to a 22nd-place finish.

Cassill returned to FRM in 2017, though he drove the No. 34 as David Ragan returned to the team in the No. 38. His main sponsors were Starkey Hearing Foundation, CSX (Play it safe), and Love's Travel Stops.

It was announced on October 10, 2017, that Cassill would not be returning to Front Row Motorsports in 2018.

2018–2023
After losing his ride in 2017, Cassill came into the 2018 season as a free agent. Following the release of Jeffrey Earnhardt from StarCom Racing, Cassill was announced as the new driver of the No. 00 Chevrolet Camaro with sponsorship from the United States First Responders Association beginning at Martinsville. Cassill finished last after mechanical failure took the car out of the event. The following race proved much better, as Cassill finished 21st. Cassill would return once again at Bristol with sponsorship from Superior Essex and TW Cable where he would finish in the 20th position. At Homestead, he drove the No. 89 car fielded by Morgan Shepherd's Shepherd Racing Ventures team.

On December 17, 2018, it was announced that Cassill would drive the No. 00 car full-time in 2019. During the year, Cassill had the lowest crash rate among Cup drivers.

In April 2019, Cassill returned to JD Motorsports for the Talladega Xfinity race, driving the No. 4 as usual driver Ross Chastain was with Kaulig Racing for the event. He also ran ten Xfinity races for Shepherd Racing Ventures, failing to finish all but one as the team could not afford to run the full distance. Regardless, Cassill was able to qualify ninth in the Rhino Pro Truck Outfitters 300 at Las Vegas, the team's first top-ten qualifying effort since 2009. For the season-ending Ford EcoBoost 300 at Homestead, the team acquired enough sponsorship to enable the No. 89 to race the entire event. After qualifying 13th, Cassill finished 15th for the team's first completed race since 2013 and their first top-15 run since 2009.

Although he was under contract for the 2020 season, Cassill lost his ride at StarCom to Quin Houff. Thus, he planned to run a full Xfinity schedule for Shepherd Racing Ventures pending funding. After skipping the opener at Daytona, Cassill entered the next three races before the season was impacted by the COVID-19 pandemic; sponsorship troubles due to the pandemic prevented SRV from returning for the rest of the year. Cassill instead served as a substitute in the event of a driver testing positive for COVID-19, though his duties were ultimately not required.

In 2021, Cassill rejoined JD Motorsports and the No. 4 for the full Xfinity season. Ahead of the Dover race in May, Cassill swapped cars with JDM teammate Ryan Vargas and moved to the No. 6 to help it accumulate owner points. At the time of the switch, the No. 6 was 37th in owner points, which would have jeopardized its qualifying ability for later races. He scored no top tens, failed to qualify for the season finale at Phoenix, and finished 22nd in the final standings.

On December 9, 2021, Kaulig Racing announced that Cassill would replace Jeb Burton in the No. 10, bringing sponsorship funding from Voyager Digital as it signed a two-year extension. His best run of the 2022 season would come at New Hampshire, leading 17 laps and finishing 3rd although he was disqualified in post-race technical inspection and would be scored 37th.

On January 18, 2023, Cassill announced that he would not be returning to Kaulig Racing full-time for the 2023 XFINITY season.

Motorsports career results

Career summary

NASCAR
(key) (Bold – Pole position awarded by qualifying time. Italics – Pole position earned by points standings or practice time. * – Most laps led.)

Cup Series

Daytona 500

Xfinity Series

Camping World Truck Series

K&N Pro Series East

K&N Pro Series West

 Season still in progress
 Ineligible for series points
 Cassill started the 2013 season running for Sprint Cup Series points but switched to the Nationwide Series starting at Charlotte in May.
 Cassill started the 2019 season running for Cup Series points, but switched to the Xfinity Series starting at Talladega in April.

ARCA Re/Max Series
(key) (Bold – Pole position awarded by qualifying time. Italics – Pole position earned by points standings or practice time. * – Most laps led.)

References

External links

Living people
1989 births
Sportspeople from Cedar Rapids, Iowa
Racing drivers from Iowa
NASCAR drivers
ARCA Menards Series drivers
CARS Tour drivers
International Kart Federation drivers
Hendrick Motorsports drivers
JR Motorsports drivers
ARCA Midwest Tour drivers